Richard Biefnot (24 March 1949 – 18 August 2020) was a Belgian politician. He served on the Parliament of Wallonia and the Chamber of Representatives and was a member of the Socialist Party.

Biography
Biefnot was a fiscal and social advisor. He served as President of the Centre de délassement du Grand Large in Mons.

On 18 May 2009, Biefnot was indicted and charged with possession of child porn, but was not convicted. However, he was expelled from the Socialist Party and resigned from his post as Communal Councillor in Mons.

Richard Biefnot died on 18 August 2020 at the age of 71.

References

1949 births
2020 deaths
People from Mons
Socialist Party (Belgium) politicians